Le Saguenay-et-son-Fjord (Saguenay and its Fjord) is a census division (CD) of Quebec, with geographical code 94. 

It consists of the Le Fjord-du-Saguenay Regional County Municipality and the territory equivalent to a regional county municipality (TE) of Saguenay (which is a city and also a census subdivision).

Prior to February 18, 2002, the separate municipalities that were amalgamated into the current city of Saguenay were all part of Le Fjord-du-Saguenay Regional County Municipality.  The territory of the pre-2002 Le Fjord-du-Saguenay regional county municipality corresponded exactly to that of Le Saguenay-et-son-Fjord census division.

References

Census divisions of Quebec